V. Selvaraj (born 16 December 1970) is a former Singaporean football forward and a current football coach.

Playing career

Club career 
Selvaraj played for n the S.League, and also played for Singapore.

In 1994, Selvaraj played for Singapore Lions as a striker in the Malaysia Cup. On 30 December, he scored his first goal for Singapore against Perak.

In 1996, Selvaraj joined SAFFC as a forward. From 1999, he was dropped behind and played as a defensive midfielder, defending and initiating attacks.

In 2002, Selvaraj left Jurong FC and rejoined SAF Warriors.

In 2004, Selvaraj considered retirement from football but extended for another year after speaking with Warriors' manager, Kok Wai Leong, and coach, Kim Poulsen.

Coaching career 
Selvaraj started his coaching career at SAFFC after his retirement from playing in 2005, progressing through the coaching ranks until he becomes the head coach of the club, now renamed as Warriors FC, at the start of the 2013 S.League season. He only lasted half a season as head coach, resigning in early June that year due to poor performances of the club in the league and elimination from all cup tournaments.

From 2015 to 2016, Selvaraj coached the NFA U15, who are taking part in AFF Championship, Lion City Cup and AFC Qualifiers.

Selvaraj returned to S.League in 2017, taking helm of Garena Young Lions. However he resigned in May due to family reasons and was replaced by Richard Tardy.

In October 2018, Selvaraj became the coach of Laos' age-group national teams and also assisted V. Sundramoorthy in managing the Laos national football team. In October 2021, Selvaraj took over the senior team's head coach position from Sundramoorthy while Sundramoorthy became the Technical Director of the team.

Honours

Singapore Lions 

 Malaysia Cup : 1994

SAFFC 

 S.League :1996, 1997, 1998, 2002
 Singapore Cup: 1997, 1998

References

External links
 Profile at Goal.com
 Interview at Warriors FC Official Website

1969 births
Singaporean footballers
Singapore international footballers
Singaporean people of Tamil descent
Singaporean sportspeople of Indian descent
Living people
Singaporean football managers
Singapore FA players
Singapore Premier League head coaches
Warriors FC head coaches
Warriors FC players
Singapore Premier League players
Southeast Asian Games bronze medalists for Singapore
Southeast Asian Games medalists in football
Association football forwards
Competitors at the 1991 Southeast Asian Games
Singaporean expatriate football managers
Singaporean expatriate sportspeople in Laos
Expatriate football managers in Laos